Wān Kongmakpin is a village in Langhko Township, Langkho District, in the Shan State of eastern Burma. It is on a riverside location east of Wān Long.

References

External links
Maplandia World Gazetteer

Populated places in Langhko District
Langhko Township